Beaver County is a county located in the U.S. state of Oklahoma. As of the 2010 census, the population was 5,636. The county seat is Beaver. The name was given because of the presence of many beaver dams on the Beaver River, which runs through the area. It is located in the Oklahoma Panhandle.

History
The land where Beaver County is located has been under several jurisdictions.  At one time, it was part of Mexico and then Texas before Texas became a state of the United States. Then in the Compromise of 1850, Texas ceded the land that would eventually become the Oklahoma panhandle to the United States government. The area was known as "No Man's Land" because it belonged to no state or territorial government. From 1886 to 1890, it was a separate organized territory known as Cimarron Territory.  After becoming part of the Oklahoma Territory in 1890, Beaver County (first called Seventh County) covered the entire Oklahoma Panhandle. At statehood in 1907, Cimarron County was taken from the western one-third, while Texas County was taken from the middle, leaving Beaver County only in the east. Its borders are now at 100°W (east), 37°N (north), 36.5°N (south), and approximately 100.8°W (west).

Geography
It is the fifth-largest county in Oklahoma by area.

Just north of the town of Beaver is the Beaver Dunes State Park.

Major highways
  U.S. Highway 64
  U.S. Highway 83
  U.S. Highway 270
  U.S. Highway 412
  State Highway 3
  State Highway 23

Adjacent counties

 Meade County, Kansas (north)
 Clark County, Kansas (northeast)
 Harper County (east)
 Ellis County (southeast)
 Lipscomb County, Texas (south)
 Ochiltree County, Texas (southwest)
 Texas County (west)
 Seward County, Kansas (northwest)

Demographics

As of the 2010 census, there were a total of 5,636 people, 2,192 households, and 1,614 families in the county. The population density was 3 people per square mile (1/km2).  There were 2,719 housing units at an average density of 2 per square mile (1/km2).  The racial makeup of the county was 92.71% White, 0.29% Black or African American, 1.25% Native American, 0.10% Asian, 0.03% Pacific Islander, 3.76% from other races, and 1.86% from two or more races.  10.76% of the population were Hispanic or Latino of any race.

There were 2,245 households, out of which 33.50% had children under the age of 18 living with them, 66.30% were married couples living together, 6.10% had a female householder with no husband present, and 24.00% were non-families. 22.00% of all households were made up of individuals, and 12.30% had someone living alone who was 65 years of age or older.  The average household size was 2.57 and the average family size was 2.99.

In the county, the population was spread out, with 26.80% under the age of 18, 6.50% from 18 to 24, 25.80% from 25 to 44, 24.10% from 45 to 64, and 16.90% who were 65 years of age or older.  The median age was 39 years. For every 100 females, there were 102.20 males.  For every 100 females age 18 and over, there were 100.90 males.

The median income for a household in the county was $36,715, and the median income for a family was $41,542. Males had a median income of $31,013 versus $20,162 for females. The per capita income for the county was $17,905.  About 8.80% of families and 11.70% of the population were below the poverty line, including 15.80% of those under age 18 and 7.80% of those age 65 or over.

Politics

Although at one time competitive, Beaver has become strongly Republican in presidential elections. The last Democratic candidate to win the county was Harry Truman in 1948. In every election since 2000, the Republican presidential candidate has received over 85% of the county's vote.

It is part of Oklahoma's 3rd congressional district and as such is represented by Frank Lucas. In the Oklahoma Senate it is part of the 27th district and is represented by Republican Casey Murdock. In the Oklahoma House of Representatives it is part of the 61st district and is represented by Republican Kenton Patzkowsky.

Economy
Beaver County's economy has largely been based on agriculture since the turn of the 20th century. At first, the major crop was broomcorn, but that was overtaken by wheat in the 1920s. Railroads connected the county to agricultural markets and stimulated an influx of new farmers. Beginning in 1912, the Wichita Falls and Northwestern Railway built a line from Woodward through Gate to Forgan. Beaver, Meade and Englewood Railroad completed a spur in 1915 from Beaver to Forgan, which was extended westward in 1925–1927 to Hooker. New towns arose along the rail lines or old ones relocated along them.

Communities

Towns
 Beaver (county seat)
 Forgan
 Gate
 Knowles

Census-designated places
 Little Ponderosa
 Turpin

Other unincorporated communities

 Alpine
 Antelope
 Balko
 Beatrice
 Benton
 Bluegrass
 Boyd
 Bryan's Corner
 Caleyville
 Clear lake
 Cline
 Elmwood
 Floris
 Golden
 Gray
 Ivanhoe
 LaKEMP
 Lockwood
 Logan
 Madison
 Mocane
 Neutral City
 Rothwell
 Slapout
 Sod Town
 Sophia
 Sunset
 Surprise

Recreation
The  Beaver River WMA provides wildlife, hunting, fishing, boating, and swimming recreation.

Cemeteries

Meridian Cemetery
There are many unmarked graves and many lost graves.

Originally known as Cline Cemetery, established sometime in 1893 or 1894, named after the City of Cline, which is now a ghost town, was sold to Meridian Cemetery Association in 1908. It was land originally owned by Phillip Huret, Jr. and consists of two acres of land. In 1908, it was sold for $150 to the Meridian Cemetery Association.

NRHP sites

The following sites in Beaver County are listed on the National Register of Historic Places:

References

Further reading
 
  2 v. illus. (part col.) 32 cm.

External links
 Hodges, V. Pauline. "Beaver County," Encyclopedia of Oklahoma History and Culture, 2009. Accessed March 18, 2015.
 Beaver County Government site
 McCasland Digital Collection of Early Oklahoma and Indian Territory Maps

 
1890 establishments in Oklahoma Territory
Populated places established in 1890
Oklahoma Panhandle
Sundown towns in Oklahoma